Khto zverkhu? (English: Who is on top?) is the Ukrainian game show and entertainment television program, which airs on the Novyi Kanal every Thursday since its debut on March 10, 2012. The program is the Ukrainian adaptation of the series Battle of the Sexes.

Show rules 
The show involves two teams - male and female. To win, women will have to ask themselves: what do they know about the male world and how are men treated to this? Men, in turn, should do the same for women.

The duel of male and female worlds is divided into rounds consisting of blank polls, various contests and competitive games. In addition, topics that men and women do not raise in the presence of each other are discussed. The show consists of seven competitions (accumulation of money). The winner is determined in the final, the eighth round, where the winner's money is doubled.

TV presenter 
The leaders of the first three seasons were Olha Freimut and Serhiy Prytula. In the third season Olha Freimut was replaced by Ekaterina Varnava. There is also a "gentleman judge" speaking in the voice of Oleksandr Pedan. In the seventh season, Lesia Nikitiuk replaced Ekaterina Varnava.

Ratings 
The share of the first season of the show was 11.28% (14–49, a sample of "50 thousand+), and 8.84% according to the sample "All Ukraine."

References

External links 
 The show page on the Novyi Kanal website

2012 Ukrainian television series debuts
Novyi Kanal original programming